Aiba (相羽 or 相葉) may refer to:

Aiba (company), established in 1689; see list of oldest companies
 Miyuki Aiba or Takayama Aiba, characters of the 1992 anime television series Tekkaman Blade

People
, Japanese singer and voice actress
, Japanese actor, dancer and singer
, Japanese entertainment executive 
Garri Aiba (გარი აიბა, died 2004), Abkhazian revolutionary

See also
AIBA (disambiguation)

Japanese-language surnames